Vishnu Vinay is an Indian actor who appears predominantly in Malayalam films. He is the son of Malayalam film director Vinayan. Vishnu made his debut in Malayalam through the film History of Joy directed by Vishnu Govindan. Vishnu has also written the story for Hareendran Oru Nishkalankan (2007) directed by his father Vinayan.

Early life
Vishnu lives in Palarivattom, Ernakulam. He did schooling from Rajagiri, Kalamasserry and later Chinmaya Vidyalaya, Kochi. He then graduated with a BS in Aerospace Engineering from Virginia Tech, US and later pursued masters in Aeronautics from Purdue University, US.

His father Vinayan is a veteran filmmaker from the Malayalam film industry and his mother Neena is a homemaker. He has a younger sister Nikhila who is married and settled in US.
Vishnu started his career in the film industry in 2007 when he wrote the story for Hareendran Oru Nishkalankan which was turned into a film by his father. Vishnu is a trained percussionist and also has a keen interest in singing. On 19 January 2019, he married Vidhu Sreedharan, a dentist.

Filmography

All films are in Malayalam language unless otherwise noted.

As actor

As writer

References

External links
 

Indian male film actors
Living people
Male actors in Malayalam cinema
Male actors from Kochi
21st-century Indian male actors
1987 births